Faithless is a British electronica band.

Faithless may also refer to:

 Faithless (1932 film), starring Tallulah Bankhead and Robert Montgomery
 Faithless (2000 film), a Swedish film directed by Liv Ullmann
 Faithless (album), a 2004 live album by Richard Thompson
 Faithless (Marianne Faithfull album), a 1977 album by Marianne Faithfull
 "Faithless", a song by Rush from Snakes & Arrows
 "Faithless", a song by Daniel Johns from Talk
 "Faithless", a song by All That Remains from For We Are Many
 Faithless (novel), by Karin Slaughter
 Faithless servant, a legal doctrine
 The Faithless, the debut 2006 album by Nights Like These
 Reporting name of the Soviet aircraft Mikoyan-Gurevich 23-01

See also
 Unfaithful (disambiguation)
 Faithful (disambiguation)
 Faith (disambiguation)